Turning Point is a health and social care organisation that works across mental health, learning disability, substance misuse, primary care, the criminal justice system and employment. In 2017, Turning Point won the contract to deliver sexual health services in 3 London boroughs and Autism Plus joined the Turning Point group. Many of Turning Point services are regulated by the Care Quality Commission.

Organisation
Turning Point is a social enterprise and registered charity based in the United Kingdom that runs projects in more than 240 locations across England and Wales. In addition to providing direct services, Turning Point also campaigns on behalf of those with social care needs.

It has a turnover of £111m, £60m of which is for the delivery of substance misuse services, £18m for the delivery of mental health services and £34m for the delivery of support to people with a Learning Disability.

The organisation provides services support for a range of people, including those with mental health issues, learning disabilities and/or substance-related disorders.

History
Turning Point developed out of The Camberwell Alcohol Project in South East London and was founded by Barry Richards, a London businessman, in 1964.

The charity was described as "one of Princess Diana's favourite charities"; she acted as its patron from 1985 to 1997.

In 2001, Lord Victor Adebowale became Chief Executive. He left in 2020 to start a new position as permanent Chair of the NHS Confederation.

In 2015 the charity denied accusations of "black on black racism" in its appeal against the decision of an earlier employment tribunal that Adebowale had unfairly dismissed the charity's IT director, Ibukun Adebayo. The tribunal found that Adebayo's actions in accessing lewd emails about her from the charity's deputy chief executive to Adebowale constituted gross misconduct, but ruled that this did not justify Adebowale's actions. Adebayo's lawyers said that the actions were unfair because the deputy chief executive's behaviour "was more serious than the claimant's by way of his seniority and position as sponsor of Turning Point's equal opportunities policy."

Rightsteps and livelife 
In 2010, Turning Point established Rightsteps, a business-to-business mental wellbeing and health solutions provider that supports employers and employees in large organisations, SMEs and not-for-profit organisations. 

In 2019, in order to reach more people and respond to a growing number of people looking for support, Turning Point established livelife, a private pay, direct-to-consumer, online therapy service. The objective of livelife is to support those who do not qualify for mental health help because their issues are not considered severe enough, and to support those who don't want to wait for an NHS appointment, but want the same assurances of quality. All livelife and Rightsteps profits go back to Turning Point, to support the most vulnerable people in society.

See also
Care Quality Commission
NHS England
Public Health England
National Voices 
Centre for Mental Health
Improving Access to Psychological Therapies
Mental Health Foundation
Mental Health Providers' Forum
Nacro
Together

General:
 Mental health in the United Kingdom

References

External links

Rightsteps 
livelife

Addiction organisations in the United Kingdom
Charities based in London
Health in the London Borough of Tower Hamlets
Organisations based in the London Borough of Tower Hamlets
Social care in the United Kingdom
Social enterprises
Therapy
Mental health organisations in the United Kingdom